Charles Lockhart (1745 London, England – February 9, 1815 London, England), was an English organist and composer of hymn-tunes, best known for the tunes "Tamworth" (1790) and "Carlisle" (1791).

References

1745 births
1815 deaths
English organists
British male organists
English composers
Musicians from London
English hymnwriters